Paragrammatism is the confused or incomplete use of grammatical structures, found in certain forms of speech disturbance. Paragrammatism is the inability to form grammatically correct sentences. It is characteristic of fluent aphasia, most commonly receptive aphasia. Paragrammatism is sometimes called "extended paraphasia," although it is different from paraphasia. Paragrammatism is roughly synonymous with "word salad," which concerns the semantic coherence of speech rather than its production.

Cause
Huber assumes a disturbance of the sequential organization of sentences as the cause of the syntactic errors (1981:3). Most students and practitioners regard paragrammatism as the morphosyntactic "leitsymptom" of Wernicke's aphasia.

However, ever since the introduction of the term paragrammatism some students have
pointed out that paragrammatic and agrammatic phenomena, which in classical theory form
part of Broca's aphasia, may co-occur in the same patient.

History
Since Kleist introduced the term in 1916, paragrammatism has denoted a disordered mode of
expression that is characterized by confused and erroneous word order, syntactic
structure or grammatical morphology (Schlenck 1991:199f)

Most researchers suppose that the faulty syntactic structure (sentence blends,
contaminations, break-offs) results from a disturbance of the syntactic plan of the utterance
(de Bleser/Bayer 1993:160f)

In non-fluent aphasia, oral expression is often agrammatic, i.e. grammatically incomplete or incorrect. By contrast, expression in fluent aphasia usually appears grammatical, albeit with disruptions in content. Despite this persistent impression, errors of sentence structure and morphology do occur in fluent aphasia, although they take the form of substitutions rather than omissions.

See also 
 Lists of language disorders

References

External links 

Aphasias
Grammar